Space is a Latin American pay television channel owned by Warner Bros. Discovery. It airs movies, TV series and boxing events. It was launched on 11 March 1991 and it is headquartered in Buenos Aires, Argentina. This television network is aimed at an adult audience.

History 

Space was launched on 11 March 1991 as the first Latin American 24-hour movie channel. It was owned and operated by Imagen Satelital, a company owned by Argentine businessman Alberto González. In its first years, it was an entertainment network heavily centred towards films and sporting (mostly combat sports (including boxing)) events.

In 1997, Imagen Satelital was bought by Claxson Interactive Group, itself owned by Venezuelan conglomerate Grupo Cisneros. In 2002, after a graphical rebrand, Space includes artistic shows in its programming schedule.

In October 2007, Claxson Interactive Group was purchased by Turner Broadcasting System Latin America; its channels (including Space) started to be managed by the regional branch of Time Warner.
On 8 April 2008, Turner modifies Space's programming in order to avoid inside competition with TNT Latin America, and centres its programming towards action, adventure and suspense films.

In 2008, Space launches its own HD feed, and two years later, in 2011, it launches a second audio track in English to its video feeds.

Current shows

Sports 
NBA on TNT basketball games (narrated and commented by Leo Montero and Daniel Jacubovich in Spanish, Marcos César and Fabio Malavazzi in Portuguese; former basketball star Maria Paula Silva also comments during the playoffs and All-Star Game)

Soccer (for BRA viewers only due to distribution and license from Esporte Interativo Brasil) 
UEFA men's A team packages
National teams
UEFA Nations League (through 2022)
European Qualifiers (road to both UEFA Euro 2020 and 2022 FIFA World Cup)
All home Internationals
UEFA Champions League (club competition, through 2021)
CONMEBOL packages (until 2022)
2022 CONMEBOL World Cup qualifiers
Libertadores (from 2019 onwards, live and free streaming coverage only available on Facebook Watch)

Combat Sports (as Combate Space)

Professional wrestling 
 All Elite Wrestling
 Lucha Libre AAA Pro Worldwide

Boxing 

 Top Rank
 Golden Boy (except Brazil due to sublicensed from DAZN)

Films 
Various Action, Horror, Suspense and Science Fiction.

Sports

Combat Sports (as Combate Space (exc BRA viewers) 

Matchroom Boxing (sublicensed from DAZN)
Strikeforce MMA (the event is no longer aired effectively from 2013 onwards)

See also 
TNT (TV channel)

References

External links 
Official Website (Latin America) 

 
Latin American cable television networks
Spanish-language television stations
Portuguese-language television stations in Brazil
Television channels and stations established in 1991